Blinky Bill: The Mischievous Koala is a 1992 Australian animated adventure comedy film directed by Yoram Gross and distributed by his Sydney-based production company Yoram Gross Film Studios.

The film tells the story of Blinky Bill's childhood with his animal friends in the Australian bush. The peace and charm of their existence is shattered by the destruction of their homes by humans. Blinky rallies his friends as they battle to protect their homes from destruction and as he rescues his mother from captivity. The animation is superimposed over live-action footage of the Australian bush, which was filmed on location in a farm at Bobin.

Plot
The local woodlanders are carrying on with their everyday life as normal until one morning when two men Harry and Joe start clearing the entire forest with their tractor. The animals evacuate as many trees fall down, and more trees are cut down including Mrs. Koala's home, and a tree knocks Blinky Bill unconscious.

At sunrise, nothing is left of the bush and every animal is left homeless. They move out of the grounds to search for a new home, including Mr. Wombat. Blinky, dazed and confused, calls for his mother, but she is nowhere in sight. Blinky rescues a young female koala named Nutsy from a cluster of fallen trees. They both run into Mr. Wombat. Nutsy tells him that Blinky has amnesia and Mr. Wombat explains to him about his life so far.

Blinky was a very mischievous sort causing trouble and receiving a scolding from Mayor Pelican, his teacher Miss Magpie and his mother for his many antics. He once encountered and escaped Ms. Pym at her general store. His mother then disciplines him and cries about the grief he is causing her. By the end of this story, Blinky is feeling very guilty about the trouble he caused his mother, so decides to find her.

Blinky and Nutsy make their way towards a riverbank where they meet up with a hard-of-hearing Granny Grunty Koala. Down the river, they meet up with Splodge and his family who tell them about what happened to Mrs. Koala who refused to evacuate out of pride in her own home. Blinky and Nutsy make their way to the waiting line where Mayor Pelican is assigning all the woodlanders to their places. Blinky approaches the mayor who is less than pleased, and orders Nurse Angelina to take the children to the leaking North Cave. Unfortunately, Blinky's mother is not here.

Blinky asks Ruff's mother for directions to the woodchip mill. Ignoring the fact there is danger there, Blinky goes to find his mother at the mill, and Nutsy follows him as they make their way through a rampaging river and the woods. They finally make it to the mill. The wood chip mill is home to the woodcutters that felled their homes.

The next morning Blinky and Nutsy witness the woodcutters reducing the animals' former homes into sawdust, narrowly escaping the circular buzz-saw. Then they stay in hiding until night time, but as they try to escape, they alert the dogs. When Blinky slingshot the security light, Harry's wife Flo urges her husband to investigate. Blinky manages to slip out of the place, but Nutsy is trapped and makes a run for it, climbing into the bedroom of the family's daughter Claire.

Blinky tearfully goes back to tell the others about the tragic news. Blinky's gang form a rescue party, forcing Marcia, a marsupial mouse, to join them. Blinky has Jacko, a kookaburra, para-drop Marcia down the chimney of the woodcutters' house taking notes of the house layout and items. Meanwhile, Nusty climbs into Claire's bed who wakes up happy to find a real koala in her bed, and manages to get her parents to let her keep the koala temporarily.

Blinky's gang sneak up to the house at night, then break into the house, but then they start up a commotion. Claire immediately hides herself and Nutsy in her bedroom cupboard. Splodge manages to fend off both the dogs and Joe, while Blinky keeps Harry and Flo locked in their bedroom. In the chaos that follows, the wood chip machines startup. Blinky gets Nutsy out of the house and they both fight off Harry. The chain of chaotic events against Harry and Joe ends them up in a water tank. Blinky locates his mother and they all leave the place in the woodcutters' truck, while Claire waves tearfully goodbye to her new-found koala friends.

Characters

Animal characters
 Blinky Bill - a young koala and the titular movie character.
 Nutsy - a female koala and Blinky's stepsister.
 Splodge - Blinky's best friend, a kangaroo, lives with his parents.
 Marcia - one of Blinky's friends, a tomboyish marsupial mouse.
 Flap - a platypus and one of Blinky's friends.
 Mrs. Koala - Blinky's mother. She was kidnapped by Harry and his assistant Joe. 
 Mr. Wombat - Blinky's mentor. He does not like it when Blinky calls him "Wombo".
 Miss Magpie - Blinky's school teacher.
 Mayor Pelican - the Mayor of Greenpatch. He hates it when Blinky gets up to mischief.
 Mr. Gloop - Mayor Pelican's helper.
 Jacko - a spoiled kookaburra who often laughs.
 Nurse Angelina - a wallaby, who wears a nurse uniform.
 Mrs. Spotty - a mother frog.

Humans
 Harry - a fat woodcutter, Joe's boss, Flo's husband, and Claire's father.
 Joe - Harry's assistant.
 Flo - Harry's wife and Claire's mother.
 Claire - Harry and Flo's six-year-old daughter.
 Ms. Glennys Pym - a shopkeeper who has a dislike for koalas.

Cast

Soundtrack
Guy Gross composed and produced music and songs, while all lyrics of the latter are written by John Palmer except "You and Me" and "Nutsy's Ballad", where instead are by Mattie Porges. Finally, through The Danglin' Bros. performance, all songs are sung by Robyn Moore and Keith Scott except where indicated below.

Box office
Blinky Bill: The Mischievous Koala grossed $1,903,659 at the 
box office in Australia.

Television Series

The film was followed by a 26-episode television series, The Adventures of Blinky Bill that aired on Australian Broadcasting Corporation, Seven Network, and ABC For Kids for three seasons.

References

External links

Blinky Bill: The Mischievous Koala at the National Film and Sound Archive
Blinky Bill at Screen Australia
Blinky Bill at Ozmovies
Blinky Bill; songs from the movie  at Music Australia

1992 films
1990s children's adventure films
1990s children's animated films
1990s Australian animated films
Blinky Bill
Films set in Australia
Animated films based on children's books
Animated films about koalas
Films directed by Yoram Gross
Australian children's animated films
Australian children's comedy films
Australian children's adventure films
Australian children's musical films
Films scored by Guy Gross
Animated films based on Australian novels
Films with live action and animation
1990s English-language films
Roadshow Entertainment films
Australian animated feature films
Flying Bark Productions films